The Palestinian records in swimming are the fastest ever performances of swimmers from Palestine, which are recognised and ratified by the Palestinian Swimming Federation and Aquatic Sports.

All records were set in finals unless noted otherwise.

Long Course (50 m)

Men

Women

Short Course (25 m)

Men

Women

References

Palestine
Swimming